Abraham a Sancta Clara (July 2, 1644December 1, 1709) was an Augustinian monk.

Early life 
He was born Johann Ulrich Megerle, in Kreenheinstetten, Germany. He was described as "a very eccentric but popular Augustinian monk".

Career
In 1662, Abraham a Sancta Clara joined the Catholic religious order of Discalced Augustinians, and assumed the name by which he is known. In this order, he rose ro become prior provincialis and definitor of his province. He gained a great reputation for pulpit eloquence early on. He was appointed imperial court preacher of Vienna in 1669.

The people flocked to hear him, attracted by the force and simplicity of his language, the grotesqueness of his humour, and the impartial severity with which he lashed the follies of all social classes. The predominant quality of his style was an overflowing and often coarse wit. Many passages in his sermons offer loftier thoughts and more dignified language.

In his published writings, he displayed many of the same qualities as in the pulpit, shown best through the most notable specimen of his style, his didactic novel entitled Judas der Erzschelm (4 vols., Salzburg, 1686–1695). His work has been several times reproduced in whole or in part, though infected with spurious interpolations. 

He died in Vienna in December, 1709, after 65 years.

Works 

Der alte Hafen scheppert - 1672 - eLibrary Projekt ( - eLib - text in German)
Österreichisches Deo Gratias - 1688  - eLibrary Projekt ( - eLib - text in German)
Wunderlicher Traum von einem großen Narren-Nest (Wonderful Dream of a Great Nest of Fools)  - 1703 (pub. 1710) - eLibrary Projekt ( - eLib - text in German)

References

External links

Abraham a Santa Clara at the eLibrary Projekt (- eLib - )

Sancta Clara
Sancta Clara
Discalced Augustinians Order
Austrian Christian monks